Henri W. Shields was an American lawyer and politician. He served in the New York State Assembly from 1923 to 1924.

He was a Democrat. He served in New York State Assembly, representing New York City's 21st-district during the 146th and 147th New York State Legislatures. He was African American.

See also
List of African-American officeholders (1900-1959)

References

Year of birth missing
Year of death missing
African-American state legislators in New York (state)
Members of the New York State Assembly
African-American lawyers
20th-century American lawyers
Politicians from New York City
20th-century African-American politicians
Lawyers from New York City
20th-century American politicians
African-American men in politics